Celeb Jihad is a website known for sharing leaked private (often sexual) videos of celebrities as a form of jihad satire. The Daily Beast describes it as a "satirical celebrity gossip website."

The website describes itself as "a satirical website containing published rumors, speculation, assumptions, opinions, fiction as well as factual information". The site lists its owner as "Durka Durka Mohammad" a fictitious terrorist whose goal is "destroying the poisonous celebrity culture" of America.

The website has participated in a series of releases of images and video, generally believed to have been stolen from hacked cell phones, dubbed "Fappening 2.0". 

In August 2017 it released nude pictures of Lindsey Vonn, Tiger Woods, Miley Cyrus, Kristen Stewart, and Katharine McPhee. The image of Woods and Vonn, posted August 21, was suppressed in apparent reaction to legal threats on August 23; images of Carly Booth were deleted August 23 or 24.  

In November 2017 Celeb Jihad released naked images of WWE divas Saraya-Jade Bevis, JoJo Offerman, and Maria Kanellis, the latest in a long series of similar leaks of WWE celebrity images. The website has also released fake nude photos of female celebrities, including doctored photos of Meghan Markle, Taylor Swift, Megan Fox and Kate Upton.

See also 

 Celebrity sex tape
 Imagery of nude celebrities
 iCloud leaks of celebrity photos

References 

Erotica and pornography websites
Celebrity
Privacy controversies and disputes
Hacking in the 2010s
Works about jihadism
Satirical websites
Pornography in Los Angeles
Political satire